This article comprises four sortable tables of mountain summits of the Rocky Mountains of North America that are the higher than any other point north or south of their latitude or east or west their longitude in those mountains.

The summit of a mountain or hill may be measured in three principal ways:
The topographic elevation of a summit measures the height of the summit above a geodetic sea level.
The topographic prominence of a summit is a measure of how high the summit rises above its surroundings.
The topographic isolation (or radius of dominance) of a summit measures how far the summit lies from its nearest point of equal elevation.



Northernmost high summits

Southernmost high summits

Easternmost high summits

Westernmost high summits

Gallery

See also

Rocky Mountains
Geology of the Rocky Mountains
:Category:Rocky Mountains
commons:Category:Rocky Mountains
List of mountain peaks of North America
List of mountain peaks of Greenland
List of mountain peaks of Canada
List of mountain peaks of the Rocky Mountains
List of the major 4000-meter summits of the Rocky Mountains
List of the major 3000-meter summits of the Rocky Mountains
List of the ultra-prominent summits of the Rocky Mountains
List of the major 100-kilometer summits of the Rocky Mountains

List of mountain peaks of the United States
List of mountain peaks of México
List of mountain peaks of Central America
List of mountain peaks of the Caribbean
Physical geography
Topography
Topographic elevation
Topographic prominence
Topographic isolation

Notes

References

External links

Natural Resources Canada (NRC)
Canadian Geographical Names @ NRC
United States Geological Survey (USGS)
Geographic Names Information System @ USGS
United States National Geodetic Survey (NGS)
Geodetic Glossary @ NGS
NGVD 29 to NAVD 88 online elevation converter @ NGS
Survey Marks and Datasheets @ NGS
Bivouac.com
Peakbagger.com
Peaklist.org
Peakware.com
Summitpost.org

Extreme Summits of the Rocky Mountains, List Of
Mountains of North America
Lists of mountains of Canada
Lists of mountains of the United States
Lists of mountains by range